Cyprus sent a delegation of 69 athletes to the 2009 Mediterranean Games, with the Cypriot team setting a goal of seven medals overall.

References

Nations at the 2009 Mediterranean Games
2009
Mediterranean Games